The Poplița is a right tributary of the river Bâsca in Romania. It discharges into the Bâsca in Comandău.

References

Rivers of Romania
Rivers of Covasna County